Snow cream can be one of two distinct desserts.
 A dessert consisting of whipped cream with added flavorings.
 A dessert in which snow is mixed with a sweetened dairy-based liquid to make an ice cream substitute. This is also known as snow ice cream.

The cream-based dessert 

Whipped cream, with or without flavorings, was known as "snow cream" or "milk snow" (neve di latte, neige de lait) until the 17th century. Whipped egg whites were also sometimes included. There are English and continental European recipes dating to the 16th century.

The snow-based dessert 

The technique of using snow as a main ingredient in a dessert is very old. Common ingredients for this variety are a dairy based ingredient, sugar and a flavouring agent. In adding a small amount of dairy-based liquid and a flavouring agent (similar to ice cream ingredients) into clean snow, the snow melts and congeals into a simple ice cream substitute.

Other "snow" recipes 
Apple snow, with puréed apple added to the basic recipe, was popular served hot in the 17th century while a more modern version is eaten cold. Fruit juice contents were also used in lemon and orange snow. There is a Russian version that is called air pie, which is egg white, sugar, and fruit pureé, whipped and served hot.

Summer snow is known as a version with fruit content, egg whites and alcohol.

Snowballs can be a variety of desserts. They are usually not related to snow cream desserts. One of these, which is more commonly known as slush, and is based on ice and fruit syrup, can be seen as related to Snow Cream.

A snow cone  or sno cone is a frozen dessert made of crushed or shaved ice, flavored with brightly colored syrup, usually fruit-flavored, served in a paper cone or cup.

See also

 Frozen yogurt
 Ice cream
 List of desserts

Notes 

Desserts
Ice cream